Pterostylis macrosepala is a plant in the orchid family Orchidaceae and is endemic to the central-west slopes of New South Wales. As with similar greenhoods, plants in flower differ from those that are not flowering. Non-flowering plants have a rosette of leaves flat on the ground, but those that are flowering have up to eight translucent green flowers with narrow, dark green stripes and up to ten stem leaves.

Description
Pterostylis macrosepala, is a terrestrial,  perennial, deciduous, herb with an underground tuber. The galea is translucent green with dark green stripes. Flowering occurs from July to September.

Taxonomy and naming
Pterostylis macrosepala was first formally described in 2006 by David Jones and given the name Bunochilus macrosepalus. The description was published in Australian Orchid Research from a specimen collected in the Conimbla National Park. In 2010, Gary Backhouse changed the name to Pterostylis macrosepala. The specific epithet (macrosepala) is derived from the Ancient Greek word makros meaning "long" and the New Latin word sepalum meaning "sepal", referring to the large fused sepals.

Distribution and habitat
This greenhood is only known from the Conimbla Range where it grows in open forest.

References

macrosepala
Orchids of New South Wales
Plants described in 2006